The  was a class of gunboat of the Imperial Japanese Army, serving during World War II. The IJA official designation was high-powered tugboat, however, they did not have any towing facilities. They were actually gunboat and escort ships. Many records were lost after the Surrender of Japan.

Ships in class

20 April 1938; completed at Ōsaka Iron Works, Sakurajima Factory.
Hereafter, her record was not left to documents.

27 February 1939; completed at Ōsaka Iron Works, Sakurajima Factory.
20 to 26 October 1944; escort operation for Harukaze Convoy (Manila - Kaohsiung).
22 to 27 November 1944; escort operation for TaKa-206 Convoy (Keelung - Naha).
Survived war in Kushigahama; later rebuilt as short-range passenger at Mitsubishi Heavy Industries, Hiroshima shipyard.
1 May 1946; transferred to Japanese National Railways (later converted to training ship).
1 September 1948; transferred to Japan Maritime Safety Agency as patrol boat (PB-31, later PS-31).
23 June 1951; retired.

Footnotes

Bibliography 
Monthly Ships of the World, (Japan)
No. 506, February 1996
No. 613, Special issue "All ships of Japan Coast Guard 1948–2003", July 2003
Shinshichirō Komamiya, The Wartime Convoy Histories,  (Japan), October 1987
Tatsuo Furukawa, Wake of train ferry 100-year (2nd issue),  (Japan), June 2001, 
100 year History of Hitachi Zōsen, Hitachi Zōsen Corporation, March 1985
Policy and Legal Affairs Division-Japan Maritime Safety Agency (JMSA), 30 year History of Japan Maritime Safety Agency, Japan Maritime Safety Agency, May 1979

World War II naval ships of Japan
Ships of the Imperial Japanese Army
 
Patrol vessels of the Japan Coast Guard
Ships built by Osaka Iron Works